Michael Dockry was a member of the Wisconsin State Assembly.

Biography
Dockry was born on August 1, 1817, in County Roscommon, Ireland. After residing in Washington County, Wisconsin, he moved to Holland, Brown County, Wisconsin.

Assembly career
Dockry was a member of the Assembly during the 1870 session. He was a Democrat.

References

19th-century Irish people
Politicians from County Roscommon
Irish emigrants to the United States (before 1923)
People from Washington County, Wisconsin
People from Holland, Brown County, Wisconsin
Democratic Party members of the Wisconsin State Assembly
1817 births
Year of death missing